The Chinese Cat (also titled Murder in the Funhouse) is a 1944 mystery film starring Sidney Toler as Charlie Chan.

Plot
Mr. Manning is murdered in his study while the door is locked from the inside.                                     Police close the case after 6 months. A girl contacts Charlie Chan to have a look                                     before he leaves in 48 hours. Twins are involved in a diamond-smuggling ring after the                                   Kohinoor Diamonds are stolen; one twin is killed and the other living twin masquerades as a ghost tricking Birmingham Brown. Mr. Manning had the largest stone stored in the secret compartment of a Chinese cat statue, and doublecrossed his associates. Movie ends in a carnival funhouse with police arresting the diamond-smuggling ring for three murders. Rival author of Manning Murder Solved book must now pay $20,000 to Chinese War Relief after a lost bet with Charlie Chan about the murderer's identity.

Cast
Sidney Toler as Charlie Chan
Mantan Moreland as Birmingham Brown, Taxi Driver
Joan Woodbury as Leah Manning
Benson Fong as Tommy Chan, #3 Son
Ian Keith as Dr. Paul Recknik
Sam Flint as Thomas Manning
Betty Blythe as Mrs. Manning
Joan Woodbury as daughter Leah Manning
Cy Kendall as Webster Deacon
John Davidson as twins Karl Karzos/Kurt Karzos 
Weldon Heyburn as Detective Lt. Harvey Dennis
Anthony Warde as Catlen

Production
The film was the second Charlie Chan movie from Monogram. It was originally called Charlie Chan and the Perfect Crime and filming started on 4 January 1944.

See also
List of American films of 1944

References

External links
Charlie Chan Family

1944 films
1944 crime films
American black-and-white films
Charlie Chan films
Monogram Pictures films
1944 mystery films
American crime films
American mystery films
Films directed by Phil Rosen
1940s American films